The Kagerplassen (a Dutch term meaning "the Kaag Lakes") is a small lake system in South Holland located to the northeast of Leiden. The Kaag Lakes are a popular area for boating, watersports, fishing, camping and walking. Windmills, waterfront pasture land (weilanden) with grazing animals, quaint Dutch boats and buildings and (in season) flower fields are all part of the charm of boating and walking in this area.

Places
The Kaag Lakes are part of two municipalities: Kaag en Braassem and Teylingen. Three villages that lay directly on the lakes are: 
 Warmond (Teylingen)
 De Kaag (Kaag en Braassem)
 Buitenkaag (Haarlemmermeer, North Holland).

A number of other villages and towns (including Leiden itself) are located on connecting waterways providing easy access to the lakes.

The Kaag Lakes consist of an interconnected system of smaller lakes and waterways. The Kaag Lakes are fenland lakes (veenplassen) and part of the Holland-Utrecht wet fenland area (veenweidegebied). There are several islands, including the following:

 The only inhabited island is Kagereiland, on which De Kaag is situated.
 Two others islands, de Lakerpolder en de Kogjespolder, are managed by the Dutch Forestry Commission (Staatsbosbeheer).
 Another island situated in the southwestern part of the system is called Boterhuiseiland (literally, "Butterhouse Island"). For at least 50 years this has been the home of the Kaag Lakes Sea Scout Centre (Zeeverkennerscentrum Kagerplassen). During the boating season this centre provides a basis for around two dozen Sea Scout groups in the region. Campgrounds on the island are also used by other Dutch Scout groups.
 There is a canal named De Zijl that connects Leiden with the Kager Lakes (in the neighborhood of Leiderdorp).

The lakes are home to several sailing schools. The oldest sailing school is 't Vossenhol, founded in 1947 and situated on the Dieperpoel. In 1952 sailing school De Kaag was founded.

The Kaag Lakes are connected to a larger network of lakes and waterways called the Holland Lakes (Hollandse Plassen). The other lake systems are called the Braassemermeer, Wijde Aa and the Westeinderplassen. They are all connected by the Haarlemmermeer Ring Waterway, the Does river and many smaller waterways. This network means that much of northern South Holland is enjoyable for boating.

Ferries

There are multiple ferry lines operating around the lakes:

 De Kaag (island) - Buitenkaag (24-hour ferry)
 Zevenhuizen - De Kaag island (seasonal ferry, operates June - August)
 Leiden (Merenwijk, north) - Eastern Warmond (bicycles and pedestrians only)

Gallery

Notes

External links
 Map of Kagerplassen on Google Maps
 Over de Kagerplassen (in Dutch only)
 Welkom op de Kaag (in Dutch only; includes detailed interactive map)
 Stichting Zeeverkennerscentrum Kagerplassen (in Dutch only)
 Stichting zeilschool 't Vossenhol (in Dutch only)
 Rederij van Hulst Boat cruises on the Kaag Lakes out of Warmond, Noordwijk Binnen and Lisse
 Rederij Triton Boat cruises on the Kaag Lakes out of Katwijk aan Zee

Lakes of the Netherlands
Landforms of South Holland
Kaag en Braassem
Teylingen